Chamaemyia bicolor is a species of fly in the family Chamaemyiidae. It is found in the Palearctic.

References

Chamaemyiidae
Insects described in 1994
Muscomorph flies of Europe